Di Capua is an Italian surname. Notable people with the surname include:

 Eduardo Di Capua, a Neapolitan composer, singer and songwriter.
 Giuseppe Di Capua, an Italian competition rowing coxswain and Olympic champion

See also

Capua (surname)

References

Italian toponymic surnames
Italian-language surnames